Beiträge zur Kenntniss des Russischen Reiches und der angränzenden Länder Asiens (Contributions to Knowledge of the Russian Empire and Neighboring Countries of Asia; est. 1839) was a scholarly periodical published by the Imperial Saint Petersburg Academy of Sciences in Russia. Editors included Karl Ernst von Baer and Gregor von Helmersen.

References

Further reading
 
 v.1, 1839
 v.7, 1845
 v.10, 1844
 v.12, 1847
 v.13, 1849
 v.17, 1852
 v.18, 1856
 v.20, 1856
 v.23, 1861

Defunct journals
Publications established in 1839
Russian Academy of Sciences academic journals
German-language journals